G. L. Roberts Collegiate and Vocational Institute is located in Oshawa, Ontario within the Durham District School Board. The school has students in grades 9-12 and offers a wide range of academic and extracurricular activities.

Sports at GL include Basketball, Volleyball, Rugby, Badminton, and Track & Field.

Sports
Boys Senior Basketball (Grades 11 & 12)
Boys Junior Basketball (Grades 9 & 10)
Girls Senior Basketball (Grades 11 & 12)
Girls Junior Basketball (Grades 9 & 10)
Boys Senior Soccer (Grades 11 & 12)
Boys Junior Soccer (Grades 9 & 10)
Girls Senior Soccer (Grades 11 & 12)
Girls Junior Soccer (Grades 9 & 10)

Awards

See also
List of high schools in Ontario

Sources

External links
G L Roberts Collegiate and Vocational Institute

High schools in Oshawa
Educational institutions in Canada with year of establishment missing